Glipa favareli is a species of beetle in the genus Glipa. It was described by Pic in 1917.

References

favareli
Beetles described in 1917